Philip Chute or Chowte (born by 1506 – 1567), of Horne Place, Appledore, Kent, was an English member of parliament in Elizabethan England.  He is the progenitor of Chute dynasty in England and Ireland from the Chutes of Hampshire and Norfolk, and during the plantation of Limerick a branch moved to settled at Chute Hall.

After the dissolution he was an MP for Winchelsea 1542 and 1545.

Philip was standard bearer to King Henry VIII. 

Philip Chute was given Horne's Place by the Queen Mary.

References

Bibliography
 John Burke, History of the Commoners of Great Britain and Ireland, (London 1838) vol.III

1567 deaths
Year of birth uncertain
People from Appledore, Kent
English MPs 1542–1544
English MPs 1545–1547